Davis McKee Wendzel (born May 23, 1997) is an American professional baseball infielder in the Texas Rangers organization. He played college baseball for the Baylor Bears.

Amateur career
Wendzel attended JSerra Catholic High School in San Juan Capistrano, California. Unselected in the 2016 Major League Baseball draft, he enrolled at Baylor University to play college baseball for the Baylor Bears.

In 2017, Wendzel's freshman year at Baylor, he appeared in fifty games (47 being starts), hitting .301 with eight home runs and thirty RBIs, earning a spot on the Big 12 All-Freshman Team. As a sophomore in 2018, he started 58 games and batted .310 with eight home runs and 49 RBIs. After the season, he was selected by the Boston Red Sox in the 37th round of the 2018 MLB draft, but did not sign.  He played in the Cape Cod Baseball League for the Hyannis Harbor Hawks that summer. In 2019, his junior season, he hit .367 with eight home runs, 42 RBIs, and 11 stolen bases in 46 games and was named the 2019 Big 12 Co-Player of the Year (along with Texas Tech's Josh Jung).

Professional career
Wendzel was selected by the Texas Rangers in the Competitive Balance Round A, with the 41st overall pick, of the 2019 Major League Baseball draft. On July 3, 2019, Wendzel signed with the Rangers for a $1.6 million signing bonus. After signing, Wendzel sat out of game action while rehabbing a thumb injury that he suffered in June while playing for Baylor. On August 22, he was assigned to the Arizona League Rangers of the Rookie-level Arizona League and made his professional debut. On August 30, Wendzel and the AZL Rangers won the 2019 Arizona League championship. Wendzel finished the 2019 season with the Spokane Indians of the Class A Short Season Northwest League. Over seven games between the two teams, he batted .316 with one home run.

Wendzel did not play a minor league game in 2020 due to the cancellation of the minor league season caused by the COVID-19 pandemic. To begin the 2021 season, he was assigned to the Frisco RoughRiders of the Double-A Central. On May 27, he was placed the injured list with a hamate bone fracture, and was activated in mid-August. After the end of Frisco's season in mid-September, he was promoted to the Round Rock Express of the Triple-A West. Between 63 games played with Frisco, Round Rock, and Arizona Complex League Rangers, Wendzel hit a combined .238/.346/.399/.745 with eight home runs and 32 RBIs. Wendzel spent the 2022 season back with Round Rock but missed a brief period due to injury. Over 83 games, he slashed .212/.293/.407 with 17 home runs and 51 RBIs.

References

External links

Baylor Bears bio

1997 births
Living people
Sportspeople from Irvine, California
Baseball players from California
Baseball third basemen
Baylor Bears baseball players
Hyannis Harbor Hawks players 
Arizona League Rangers players
Arizona Complex League Rangers players
Spokane Indians players
Frisco RoughRiders players
Round Rock Express players